Paula Maxine Patton (born December 5, 1975) is an American actress and producer. Patton made her feature film debut in the 2005 comedy Hitch, and has had starring roles in the films Déjà Vu (2006), Precious (2009), Jumping the Broom (2011), Mission: Impossible – Ghost Protocol (2011), 2 Guns (2013), Warcraft (2016), and Sacrifice (2019).

Early life and education
Patton was born in Los Angeles, California, to Joyce (née Vanraden), a school teacher, and Charles Patton, a lawyer. Her mother is white, of German and Dutch descent, and her father is Black of African descent. She graduated from Alexander Hamilton High School, and then started college at University of California, Berkeley, transferring to University of Southern California's Film School after her first year. Shortly after completing her studies, she won a three-month assignment making documentaries for PBS.

Career
Patton provided additional vocals for Usher on his 2004 album Confessions. She provided the female vocal counterpart on the song "Can U Handle It?" which was co-written by Robin Thicke, whom she would later marry. Patton has song-writing credits on multiple Robin Thicke albums under the name "Max", derived from her middle name (Maxine). Patton made her film debut with a small part in the 2005 romantic comedy film Hitch, alongside Will Smith. In the same year, she followed that with a small part in the drama film London. In 2006, she appeared alongside OutKast members Andre Benjamin and Big Boi in the musical film Idlewild written and directed by Bryan Barber.

Patton's big break came in 2006 when she landed the pivotal female lead role of Claire Kuchever in the science fiction thriller Déjà Vu alongside Denzel Washington. The film received mixed reviews from critics, but was a box office hit, grossing over  worldwide. She also appeared in her then-husband Robin Thicke's "Lost Without You" video in 2006. In an interview with Hot 97 Paula revealed on Ebro in the Morning that she ghostwrote with her ex-husband Robin Thicke under the name Max Haddington. In 2008, Patton played television reporter Kate Madison in the comedy-drama Swing Vote alongside Kevin Costner and Amy Carson, the wife of Ben (Kiefer Sutherland) in the supernatural horror film Mirrors. In Lee Daniels's critically acclaimed drama film Precious (2009), she played Ms. Blu Rain, a teacher at the alternative high school in Harlem, New York, who teaches and mentors disadvantaged students, including the titular character, Claireece Precious Jones (Gabourey Sidibe). She later co-starred as Queen Latifah's character's god-sister in the romantic comedy Just Wright (2010).

In late 2010, it was announced that Patton would succeed Sharon Stone as the new full time assistant district attorney on the NBC crime drama series, Law & Order: Special Victims Unit. When Patton was cast in the lead female role in action film Mission: Impossible – Ghost Protocol, however, her role on Law & Order: Special Victims Unit was reduced to one episode. She was replaced by Melissa Sagemiller. Mission: Impossible was released on December 16, 2011, and was a critical and commercial success, grossing almost  worldwide. Also in 2011, Patton played the leading role in the comedy film Jumping the Broom.

In 2013, Patton co-starred alongside Denzel Washington and Mark Wahlberg in the action comedy film 2 Guns, and starred in the leading role in the romantic comedy film Baggage Claim. The latter film received negative reviews from numerous critics. On February 24, 2015, it was announced that Patton was cast as lead character in the ABC crime drama pilot Runner. It was not picked up to series.

In 2016, Patton starred in the romantic comedy film The Perfect Match, alongside Terrence Jenkins and Cassie Ventura, appeared alongside Adam Sandler and David Spade in direct-to-Netflix comedy film The Do-Over, and starred as Garona Halforcen in the Warcraft film adaptation, released in June.

In January 2017, Patton was cast in the lead role of the ABC drama series Somewhere Between, which premiered as a mid-season replacement on July 24, 2017, and was cancelled after one season. In 2019, she starred in the BET+ first original film, Sacrifice.

Personal life
In 1991, at age 15, Patton met recording artist Robin Thicke, who was then 14, at an under-21 hip-hop club called Balistyx (co-founded and co-hosted by David Faustino) on the Sunset Strip in Los Angeles, when Thicke asked her to dance. According to Thicke, he sang Stevie Wonder's "Jungle Fever" to her as they danced. The couple did not begin dating until October 1993 and married on June 11, 2005. Patton gave birth to their son, Julian Fuego, on April 6, 2010. They announced their separation on February 24, 2014, after 21 years together and almost nine years of marriage. On October 8, 2014, Patton officially filed for divorce and joint custody of their son. The divorce was finalized on March 20, 2015.

In January 2017, a judge denied Patton's request to limit Thicke's custody after she accused him of child abuse. Later that month, Patton was granted sole custody and a restraining order that included their son Julian and her mother Joyce Patton against Thicke after she accused him of domestic violence, infidelity, and drug and alcohol addiction. Patton and Thicke reached a custody agreement in August 2017.

Filmography

Awards and nominations

References

External links

 
 
 

1975 births
21st-century American actresses
Actresses from Los Angeles
African-American actresses
Alexander Hamilton High School (Los Angeles) alumni
American film actresses
American television actresses
American people of Dutch descent
American people of German descent
Living people
USC School of Cinematic Arts alumni
21st-century African-American women
21st-century African-American people
20th-century African-American people
20th-century African-American women